Zebeda Rekhviashvili (born February 16, 1991, in Georgian) is a Georgian born Serbian judoka. He won a Bronze Medal at the 2013 European Judo Championships.

References

External links
 

1991 births
Living people
Male judoka from Georgia (country)
Serbian male judoka